Poliçan may refer to:
 Poliçan, city in Berat County, Albania
 Poliçan, Gjirokastër, village in the Dropull municipality, Gjirokastër County, Albania